T. crispa may refer to:

 Tinospora crispa, a vine in the family Menispermaceae
 Trichopilia crispa, an orchid in the genus Trichopilia
 Tritonia crispa, an iris in the genus Tritonia